The Zulaica Automatic Revolver is an automatic revolver of Spanish origin. It was produced for a very short time. The weapon was fed from a 6 round cylinder and chambered in the .22 LR round.

Overview
M. Zulaica y Cia., Eibar, Spain. began manufacturing 'Velo-Dog' type pocket revolvers in the early 1900s. In 1905, Zulaica patented an unusual automatic revolver silenced design, but few were ever manufactured and even fewer have survived.

References

.22 LR revolvers
Revolvers of Spain
Automatic revolvers